Odissea is the fifth studio album released by Mango, in 1986.

The album contains some of his most known songs - "Lei verrà" and "Oro" - and two songs in English language - "Love is just a melody" and "Modern love" co-written with Simon Marsh. "Oro" was originally called "Mama voodoo" with lyrics by the singer's brother Armando Mango. Later, the title was changed and the final lyrics were written by Mogol.

Brian Auger provided hammond organ on the album.

Italian singer Mina covered "Oro" on Canarino mannaro (1994).

Track listing

Personnel
Mango - lead vocals, choir, keyboards
Mauro Paoluzzi - guitars, percussion
Aldo Banfi - synclavier, synclavier programming
Amedeo Bianchi - sax, trumpet
Brian Auger - hammond organ
Laura Valente, Demi Laino - choirs
Andrea Ballista - choir in "Lei verrà"

References 

Mango albums
1986 albums